Herbert Brotherson Jamison (September 17, 1875 – June 22, 1938) was an American sprinter who won a silver medal in the 400 m at the 1896 Summer Olympics. His favorite event, 200 m, was not yet part of the Olympics.

In 1897 Jamison graduated from Princeton University and joined the family business in agriculture. Seven years later he founded an insurance agency in his native Peoria, Illinois, which he ran until his death.

See also
List of Princeton University Olympians

References

External links

1875 births
1938 deaths
American male sprinters
Athletes (track and field) at the 1896 Summer Olympics
19th-century sportsmen
Olympic silver medalists for the United States in track and field
Medalists at the 1896 Summer Olympics